The Wonder Kid is a 1952 British drama film directed by Karl Hartl and starring Bobby Henrey, Elwyn Brook-Jones and Oskar Werner. The film was completed in 1950, premiered in Europe in January 1951 but was not given a full release in Britain for a further year.

Plot
Sebastian Giro is a ten-year-old French boy and child musical prodigy found in an orphanage by Mr Gorik (Elwyn Brook-Jones) who exploits the youngster’s talent as a classical pianist and turns him into an international celebrity. He even tells everyone that the boy is only seven years old to make the boy wonder’s talent seem all the more remarkable.

But Gorik is also a crook who embezzles the takings so that he has almost all the money and Sebastian gets hardly any. Coupled with that, Gorik won’t allow Sebastian to enjoy the simple pleasures of being a little boy, like playing with other boys or even reading comic books, because, when Sebastian isn’t performing, Gorik isn’t making any money out of him. He works the over tired boy like a slave who must continually practice on the piano.

Sebastian’s elderly English governess, Miss Frisbie (Muriel Aked) is very concerned about the boy and confronts Gorik about his crooked activities. But he dismisses her from her post. Miss Frisbie then pays a gang of crooks to "kidnap" Sebastian and take him to stay in a remote lodge in the Austrian Tyrol, where the boy has never been so free and happy and Gorik won’t get him back until he’s paid over a huge ransom which is, in effect, all the money he has stolen from the boy.

Production
The Wonder Kid was filmed on location in Austria and at Isleworth Studios in England in late 1949 and early 1950, but not released until 1952. The film's sets were designed by the art directors Joseph Bato and Werner Schlichting.

Cast
 Bobby Henrey as 	Sebastian Giro
 Elwyn Brook-Jones as Mr. Gorik
 Muriel Aked as 	Miss Frisbie
 Oskar Werner as 	Rudi
 Robert Shackleton as Rocks Cooley
 Christa Winter as Anni
 Sebastian Cabot as Pizzo
 Klaus Birsch as 	Nik
 Paul Hardtmuth as Professor Bindl
 June Elvin as 	Miss Kirsch

References

External links

1952 films
Austrian comedy films
English-language Austrian films
Films directed by Karl Hartl
Films about orphans
Films about pianos and pianists
Films about child abduction
Films shot in Austria
Films set in Austria
British black-and-white films
Films shot at Isleworth Studios
British comedy films
1952 comedy films
1950s English-language films
1950s British films